Antonina Krzysztoń (born 13 June 1954 in Kraków, Poland) is a Polish singer-songwriter.

On 3 May 2006 the Polish President, Lech Kaczyński, awarded her the Officer's Cross of the Order of Polonia Restituta.

Discography
 1990 Inne światy
 1992 Pieśni postne
 1993 Takie moje wędrowanie
 1995 Czas bez skarg
 1996 Kiedy przyjdzie dzień
 1998 Każda chwila
 2000 Wołanie
 2000 Złota kolekcja "Perłowa Łódź"
 2004 Dwa księżyce

External links 
 

1954 births
Living people 
Polish women singers
Musicians from Kraków
Officers of the Order of Polonia Restituta
Sung poetry of Poland
Cabaret singers